A partial  list of notable Crimean Tatars, in alphabetical order:

Military personnel  
 Alime Abdenanova – Soviet spy during World War II
 Teyfuq Abdul – battalion commander in the Red Army during World War II; Hero of the Soviet Union
 Seitnebi Abduramanov – platoon commander in the Red Army during World War II
 Uzeir Abduramanov – sapper in the Red Army during World War II; Hero of the Soviet Union
 Fetislyam Abilov – regimental commander during World War II; belatedly declared Hero of the Soviet Union in 1990
 Umer Adamanov – partisan detachment leader who defended Polish villages from the SS
 Ismail Bulatov – Major-general
 Emir Chalbash – flying ace
 Dzhevdet Dermendzhi – infantry officer, nominated for title Hero of the Soviet Union
 Nuri Dzhelilov – tank officer, nominated for title Hero of the Soviet Union
 Amet-khan Sultan – flying ace, test pilot, and double Hero of the Soviet Union
 Kenan Kutub-zade – Red Army World War II cameraman who filmed scenes in Auschwitz used in the Nuremberg trials
 Refat Mustafaev – battalion commissar and partisan leader
 Mansur Mazinov – first Crimean Tatar pilot
 Abdraim Reshidov – decorated Pe-2 pilot and Hero of the Soviet Union; told KGB that he would commit self-immolation during a public holiday if he was forced to remain in exile.
 Seytnafe Seytveliyev – sergeant in the Red Army; Hero of the Soviet Union
 Dzhafer Osman Topchi – infantry officer, twice nominated for the title Hero of the Soviet Union
 Asan Khaliev – Red Army sniper with over 240 kills

Politicians 
 Kázím Abdulakim – former Deputy Mayor of Constanța and a Member of the Romanian Parliament
 Ruslan Balbek – Member of the Russian Duma
 Noman Çelebicihan – first President of the Crimean People's Republic
 Refat Çubarov – Chairman of the Mejlis
 Cemil Çiçek – Speaker of the Parliament of Turkey
 Dimitrie Cantemir, from Cantemir dynasty – voivode of Moldova
 Fahrettin Kerim Gökay – governor of Istanbul
 Ahmed İhsan Kırımlı – president of the Crimean Tatar Society of Turkey
 Vasily Kochubey – was a Russian Imperial state figure and member of Kochubey family
 Adnan Menderes – first democratically elected Prime Minister of Turkey
Nazim Osmanov – leader of Mubarek
 Ahmet Tevfik Pasha – last Grand Vizier of the Ottoman Empire
 Hasan Polatkan – Minister of Labor and Finance of Turkey
 Zeki Sezer – politician and former chairman of the Democratic Left Party (DSP)
 Sevil Shhaideh – Deputy Prime Minister of Romania
 Hafsa Sultan – first valide sultan of the Ottoman Empire as mother of Suleiman the Magnificent
Seit Tairov – secretary of the Jizzakh regional committee in the Uzbek SSR
Lilya Budzhurova - deputy of the Verkhovna Rada of Crimea.

Writers and intellectuals 
 Ayshe Seitmuratova – dissident
 Ahatanhel Krymsky – scientist
 Shamil Aladin – newspaper editor, poet, and novelist
 Şevqiy Bektöre – textbook writer, linguist, and gulag detainee
 Usein Bodaninsky – historian, museum director, and ethnographer
 Muazzez İlmiye Çığ – archaeologist, sumerologist, assyriologist, writer
 Bekir Çoban-zade – poet and professor; victim of the Great Purge
 Cengiz Dağcı – novelist and poet
 Emel Emin – poet, translator, Turkologist, and educator
 Seitumer Emin – writer and poet
 Tahsin Gemil  – historian 
 Necip Hablemitoğlu – writer and historian; assassinated
 Halil İnalcık – historian
 Murat Bardakçı – journalist
 Ismail Gaspirali – founder of the Jadid movement
 Abdulla Latif-zade – literary critic, poet, and writer
 Aziz Nesin – humorist and writer of over 100 books
 Mehmet Niyazi – poet, journalist, academic and activist
 İlber Ortaylı – historian
 Septar Mehmet Yakub – lawyer, thinker, Mufti of Romania
 Çetin Altan – writer, politician
 Ennan Alimov – writer, artist

Civil rights activists 
 Reşat Amet – murdered activist
 Mustafa Dzhemilev – leader of the Mejlis
 Emir-Usein Kuku – human rights defender
 Musa Mamut – committed self-immolation in protest of being forced to leave Crimea
 Server Mustafayev – human rights defender
 Yuri Osmanov – one of the founders of the National Movement of Crimean Tatars; assassinated
 Ayshe Seitmuratova – activist for right of return who were deported as young children
 Ali Osman Becmambet- national hero of the Tatars in Dobrogea ( Romania )

Entrepreneurs 

 Feyzi Akkaya – one of the founders of STFA Construction Group
 Yıldırım Demirören – businessman, president of the Turkish Football Federation
 Sabri Ülker -  Turkish industrialist and businessman, and the founder of Ülker.

Athletes 

 Djamolidine Abdoujaparov – Cyclist, three-time winner of Green Jersey in the Tour de France
 Enver Ablaev – skier
 Denis Alibec – Romanian footballer
 Server Djeparov – professional soccer player
 Ersan İlyasova – professional basketball player
 İlhan Mansız – former professional soccer player
 Aihan Omer – former handball player and coach

Artists, musicians, and popular culture personalities 
 Zarema - Singer, songwriter, actress. Signed and released an album with Sony Music in 2007. Co-wrote the song "Night Of My Life" with legendary multi Grammy winning producer RedOne. Member of SAG-AFTRA.
 Melek Amet – first Crimean Tatar fashion model in Romania
 Cüneyt Arkın – film actor, producer and director
 Gürer Aykal – conductor and adjunct professor at Bilkent University; the musical director and principal conductor of the Borusan Istanbul Philharmonic Orchestra
 Erol Büyükburç – singer-songwriter, pop music composer
Ayşe Dittanova – actress
 Adaviye Efendieva – master weaver and embroiderer
 Esin Engin musician, composer, arranger and film actor
 Erol Evgin – pop singer and composer
 Enver İzmaylov – folk and jazz musician
 Jamala – winner of 2016 Eurovision Song Contest representing Ukraine
 Evelina Mambetova – international supermodel
 Aybüke Pusat – actress and model
 Aydan Şener – 1981 Miss Turkey
 Akhtem Seitablayev – director of the film Haytarma
 Nilüfer Yumlu – pop singer and Eurovision contestant
 Selda Bağcan – musician
 Orhan Gencebay – musician and actor

Scientists, Engineers, and Mathemeticians
 Ali Aliev – nanoscientist
 Refat Appazov – OKB-1 engineer
 Lenur Arifov – nuclear physicist
 Asan Asan-Nuri – petroleum engineer
 Girey Bairov – surgeon
 Kerim Bekirbaev – aircraft designer
 Midat Selimov – infectious disease specialist
 Rollan Kadyev – physicist

See also 
 List of Crimean khans

 

Crimean Tatars
Crimean Tatars
Russia-related lists